Lewis Cary (March 31, 1798 – November 1834) was an American silversmith active in Boston.

Cary was born in Quincy, Massachusetts. He was apparently apprenticed circa 1811–1815 to Churchill & Treadwell in Boston, and provided additional silver for Boston's West Church to supplement silver made by Churchill. It appears that Cary bought a silversmith business in 1820 from Hazen Morse (1790–1874), his brother-in-law, and worked from 1820 to 1832 as a silversmith, with his shop at 5 Piedmont Street. In 1821 he married Adeline Billings in Dorchester, Massachusetts. In 1828 he became a member of the Massachusetts Charitable Mechanic Association. Today Cary is remembered primarily for the silver he made for churches in Boston and as far away as Deerfield, Massachusetts. His work is collected in the Metropolitan Museum of Art, the Museum of Fine Arts Boston, and the Museum of Fine Arts, Houston.

References 
 Stimpson's Boston Directory, C. Stimpson, 1832, page 103.
 "Lewis Cary", American Silversmiths.
 "Creampot" by Lewis Cary, Museum of Fine Arts Boston.
 Early American Silver in The Metropolitan Museum of Art, Beth Carver Wees, Medill Higgins Harvey, Metropolitan Museum of Art, 2013, page 81.
 American Silversmiths and Their Marks: The Definitive (1948) Edition, Stephen Guernsey Cook Ensko, Courier Corporation, 1983, page 35.

American silversmiths
1798 births
1834 deaths